Enrique Moradiellos García (born 1961) is a Spanish historian. He is an expert on the foreign relations of the Spanish Civil War.

Biography 
Born in 1961 in Oviedo. After obtaining a licentiate degree in history from the University of Oviedo, Moradiellos  earned a scholarship at the Queen Mary College. In 1989, he earned a PhD in history from the University of Oviedo, reading a dissertation titled Neutralidad benévola. El gobierno británico y la insurrección militar española de 1936, officially supervised by José María Moro Barreñada yet de facto supervised by Paul Preston. He became a senior lecturer for the University of Extremadura in 1999 and professor in 2006.

Works

References 
Citations

Bibliography
 
 
 
 
 
 
 
 
 

1961 births
Historians of the Spanish Civil War
Historians of Francoist Spain
Academic staff of the University of Extremadura
University of Oviedo alumni
Academics and writers on the international relations of Spain
Living people